Stay Inside is an American post-hardcore band based in Brooklyn, New York. The band consists of Bryn Nieboer, Chris Johns, Chris Lawless, and Vishnu Anantha.

History 
The band formed in Brooklyn in 2016 and initially consisted of Bartees Strange, Chris Johns, Vishnu Anantha, and Bryn Nieboer. All the band's members were transplants; Strange was from Yukon, Oklahoma, Johns from Hockessin, Delaware, Anatha from Wayne, Pennsylvania, and Nieboer from Los Angeles. Their debut EP, As You Were was released in April 2017, followed by The Sea Engulfs Us and the Light Goes Out in 2018. That same year, the band released the collaborative EP Balancing Acts with Good Looking Friends, and The Final Girl, a with Dad Thighs and Great Weights.

In 2018, following Bartees Strange's departure to pursue a solo career, Chris Lawless joined the band on guitar and vocals. On April 10, 2020 the band's debut studio album, Viewing was released by No Sleep Records, during the coronavirus pandemic. The album was met with positive critical reception.

Members 
Current
 Bryn Nieboer - bass, vocals (2016-present)
 Chris Johns - guitar, vocals (2016-present)
 Vishnu Anantha - drums (2016-present)
 Chris Lawless - guitar, vocals (2018-present)

Former
 Bartees Strange - guitar, vocals (2016-2018)

Discography

Albums 
 Viewing (2020) - No Sleep Records

EPs and Splits 
 As You Were (2017)
 The Sea Engulfs Us and the Light Goes Out (2018)
 Balancing Act (split w/ Good Looking Friends) (2018)
 The Final Girl (split w/ Dad Thighs and Great Weights) (2019)
 Blight (2020)

Singles 
 "Offseason" (2019)

References

External links 
 Official Website

Musical groups established in 2016
2016 establishments in New York City
American post-hardcore musical groups
American emo musical groups
Emo revival groups
American screamo musical groups
Post-punk revival music groups
Punk rock groups from New York (state)
Indie rock musical groups from New York (state)
Rock music groups from New York (state)
No Sleep Records artists
Musical groups from Brooklyn